Francisco Javier Ayala Díaz (born 13 January 1990) is a Chilean footballer who currently plays for Chilean Primera División side Cobresal as a left-back.

Honors

Club
Curicó Unido
 Primera B de Chile (1): 2008

Iberia
 Segunda División (1): 2013–T

Coquimbo Unido
 Primera B de Chile (1): 2018

External links
 
 

1989 births
Living people
Chilean footballers
Primera B de Chile players
Chilean Primera División players
Curicó Unido footballers
Deportes Copiapó footballers
Deportes Iberia footballers
Unión San Felipe footballers
Coquimbo Unido footballers
Deportes Melipilla footballers
Puerto Montt footballers
Cobresal footballers
Association football defenders
People from Curicó Province